Monilispira archeri is an extinct species of sea snail, a marine gastropod mollusc in the family Pseudomelatomidae.

Description
The length of the shell attains 15 mm.

Distribution
Fossils were found in Pliocene strata in Florida, USA

References

 A.A. Olsson and A. Harbison, 1953. Pliocene Mollusca ofsouthern Florida, with special reference to those from north SL Petersburg; Acad. Nat. Sci. Philadelphia, Monogr. 8:1457.

archeri
Gastropods described in 1953